Santa Cecilia in Trastevere is a 5th-century church in Rome, Italy, in the Trastevere rione, devoted to the Roman martyr Saint Cecilia (early 3rd century AD).

History

The first church on this site was founded probably in the 3rd century, by Pope Urban I; it was devoted to the young Roman woman Cecilia, martyred it is said under Marcus Aurelius Severus Alexander (A.D. 222–235). Tradition holds that the church was built over the house of the saint.  The baptistery associated with this church, together with the remains of a Roman house of the early Empire, was found during some excavations under the Chapel of the Relics. By the late fifth century, at the Synod of 499 of Pope Symmachus, the church is mentioned as the Titulus Ceciliae.    On 22 November 545, Pope Vigilius was celebrating the feast of the saint in the church, when the emissary of Empress Theodora, Anthemius Scribo, captured him.

Pope Paschal I rebuilt the church in 822, and moved here the relics of St Cecilia from the Catacombs of St Calixtus. More restorations followed in the 18th century.

The cardinal priest who is currently assigned to Santa Cecilia in Trastevere is Gualtiero Bassetti. His predecessors include: are Pope Stephen III, Pope Martin IV (1261-1281), Adam Easton (1383), Pope Innocent VIII (1474-1484), Thomas Wolsey (1515), Pope Gregory XIV (1585-1590), Michele Mazzarino (1647), Giuseppe Doria Pamphili (1785), Mariano Rampolla (1887-1913), and Carlo Maria Martini (d. 2012).

Since 1527, a community of Benedictine nuns has lived in the monastery next to Santa Cecilia, and has had charge of the basilica.

The inscriptions found in Santa Cecilia, a valuable source illustrating the history of the church, have been collected and published by Vincenzo Forcella.

Art and architecture

The church has a façade built in 1725 by Ferdinando Fuga, which incloses a  courtyard decorated with ancient mosaics, columns and a cantharus (water vessel). Its decoration includes the coat of arms and the dedication to the titular cardinal who paid for the facade, Francesco Cardinal Acquaviva d'Aragona.

Among the artifacts remaining from the 13th century edifice are a mural painting depicting the Last Judgment (1289–93) by Pietro Cavallini in the choir of the nuns, and the ciborium (1293) in the presbytery by Arnolfo di Cambio. The Gothic ciborium is surrounded by four marble columns white and black, decorated with statuettes of angels, saints, prophets, and evangelists.  

The Last Judgement fresco which remains today, covering the entire width of the west wall of the entrance, is likely part of a cycle of Old and New Testament scenes by Cavallini on the north and south nave walls, based on remaining fragments of an Annunciation scene and stories of the life of Jacob. The frescoes were plastered over in a remodeling under Cardinal Francesco Acquaviva in 1724, which included building an enclosed choir, the floor of which cuts off part of the Last Judgement. Rediscovered in 1900, the fresco may be viewed during limited weekday hours for a small 2,50 euro fee paid to the Benedictine nuns who of the church. Luigi Vanvitelli also did a altarpiece, Apparition of the Angel to St. Cecili, and a fresco, Angels Musicians, located in the Chapel of the Relics, just some of his few surviving paintings.

The apse has remains of 9th century mosaics depicting the Redeemer with Saints Paul, Cecilia, Paschal I, Peter, Valerian, and Agatha.

The ceiling of Cappella dei Ponziani was decorated God the Father with evangelists (1470) by Antonio del Massaro (Antonio da Viterbo or il Pastura). The Cappella delle Reliquie was frescoed and provided with an altarpiece by Luigi Vanvitelli. The nave is frescoed with the Apotheosis of Santa Cecilia (1727) by Sebastiano Conca. The church contains two altarpieces by Guido Reni: Saints Valerian and Cecilia and a Decapitation of Saint Cecilia (1603). 

Under the ciborium of di Cambio that shelters the main altar, is a glass case enclosing the white marble sculpture of St Cecilia (1600) by the late-Renaissance sculptor Stefano Maderno. A marble slab in the pavement in front of the case, quotes Maderno's sworn statement that he has recorded the body as he saw it when the tomb was opened in 1599.  The statue depicts the three axe strokes described in the 5th-century account of her martyrdom. It also underscores the incorruptibility of her cadaver (an attribute of some saints), which miraculously still had congealed blood after centuries. This statue could be conceived as proto-Baroque, since it depicts no idealized moment or person, but a theatric scene, a naturalistic representation of a dead or dying saint. It is striking, because it precedes by decades the similar high-Baroque sculptures by Gian Lorenzo Bernini (for example, his Blessed Ludovica Albertoni) and Melchiorre Cafà (Santa Rosa de Lima).

The crypt is decorated in cosmatesque style, and contains the relics of St. Cecilia and her husband St. Valerian.  In the apse of the crypt are the remains of an altar whose inscription indicates that it was dedicated by Pope Gregory VII (1073-1085) on 3 June 1080.

List of Cardinal Protectors

Gualtiero Bassetti, (22 February 2014 - present)
Carlo Maria Martini, S.J. (1983.02.02 – 2012.08.31)
John Patrick Cody (1967.06.29 – 1982.04.25)
Albert Gregory Meyer (1959.12.17 – 1965.04.07)
Gaetano Cicognani (1953.10.29 – 1959.12.14)
Francesco Marmaggi (1936.01.04 – 1949.11.03)
Bonaventura Cerretti (1926.06.24 – 1933.03.13)
Augusto Silj (1919.12.18 – 1926.02.27)
Domenico Serafini, O.S.B. Subl. (1914.05.28 – 1918.03.05)
Mariano Rampolla del Tindaro (1887.05.26 – 1913.12.16)
Innocenzo Ferrieri (1868.09.24 – 1887.01.13)
Karl August Graf von Reisach (1861.09.27 – 1868.06.22)
Giovanni Brunelli (1853.12.22 – 1861.02.21)
Giacomo Luigi Brignole (1838.09.13 – 1847.06.11, 1847.06.11 – 1853.06.23 in commendam)
Giorgio Doria Pamfilj Landi (1818.03.16 – 1837.11.16)
Giuseppe Maria Doria Pamphilj (1802.09.20 – 1803.09.26, 1803.09.26 – 1816.02.10 in commendam)
Hyacinthe Sigismond Gerdil, B. (1784.09.20 – 1802.08.12)
Girolamo Spinola (1775.03.13 – 1775.04.03, 1775.04.03 – 1784.07.22 in commendam)
Ferdinando Maria de Rossi (1767.12.14 – 1775.02.04)
Giuseppe Maria Feroni (1764.12.17 – 1767.11.15)
Cosimo Imperiali (1759.02.12 – 1764.10.13)
Giorgio Doria (1757.01.03 – 1759.01.31)
Joaquín Fernández Portocarrero (1747.04.10 – 1753.04.09)
Troiano Acquaviva d’Aragona (1733.01.19 – 1747.03.20)
Cornelio Bentivoglio (1727.06.25 – 1732.12.30)
Filippo Antonio Gualterio (1725.01.29 – 1726.07.31)
Francesco Acquaviva (1709.01.28 – 1724.06.12, 1724.06.12 – 1725.01.09 in commendam)
Giacomo Antonio Morigia, B. (1699.04.11 – 1708.10.08)
Celestino Sfondrati, O.S.B. (1696.02.20 – 1696.09.04)
Giambattista Spinola (1681.09.22 – 1696.02.20)
Philip Thomas Howard of Norfolk, O.P. (1676.03.23 – 1679.09.25)
Ottavio Acquaviva d'Aragona (iuniore) (1658.03.18 – 1674.09.26)
Francesco Angelo Rapaccioli (1650.11.21 – 1657.05.15)
Gaspare Mattei (1648.09.28 – 1650.04.09)
Michel Mazarin, O.P. (1647.12.16 – 1648.08.31)
Giovanni Domenico Spinola (1629.04.30 – 1646.08.11)
Federico Baldissera Bartolomeo Cornaro (1627.11.15 – 1629.04.26)
Giambattista Leni (1618.03.05 – 1627.11.03)
Paolo Emilio Sfondrati (1591.01.14 – 1618.02.14)
Niccolò Sfondrati (later Pope Gregory XIV) (1585.01.14 – 1590.12.05)
Alfonso Gesualdo (1561.03.10 – 1563.10.22 pro illa vice Deaconry, 1563.10.22 – 1572.10.17)
Robert de Lenoncourt (1555.12.11 – 1560.03.13)
Charles de Guise de Lorraine (1547.11.04 – 1555.12.11)
Jean du Bellay (1535.05.31 – 1547.10.26)
Francesco Cornaro (1534.04.27 – 1534.09.05)
Gabriel de Gramont (1531.01.09 – 1534.03.26)
Thomas Wolsey (1515.09.10 – 1530.11.29)
Carlo Domenico de Carretto (1513.06? – 1514.08.15)
Francesco Alidosi (1506.08.11 – 1511.05.24)
Francisco de Borja (1500.10.05 – 1506.08.11)
Lorenzo Cibo de’ Mari (1497.12.09 – 1500.09 in commendam)
Giovanni Giacomo Schiaffinati (1484.11.17 – 1497.12.09)
Giovanni Battista Cibò (later Pope Innocent VIII) (1474.01 – 1484.08.29)
Niccolò Fortiguerra (1460.03.19 – 1473.12.21)
Rinaldo Piscicello (1457.03.21 – 1457.07.04)
Louis Aleman, C.R.S.J. (1426.05.27 – 1440.04.11, 1449.12.19 – 1450.10.16)
Antonio Caetani (seniore) (1402.02.27 – 1405.06.12)
Adam Easton, E.B.C. (1389.12.18 – 1398.08.15)
Bonaventura Badoaro de Peraga, O.E.S.A. (1378.09.18 – 1389.07.10)
Bertrand Lagier, O.F.M. (1375 – 1378.04, 1378.04 – 1392.11.08 in commendam)
Guy de Boulogne (1342.09.20 – 1350, 1350 – 1373.11.25 in commendam)
Guillaume Pierre Godin, O.P. (1312.12.23 – 1317.09.12, 1317.09.12 – 1336.06.04 in commendam)
Tommaso d'Ocra, O.S.B. Cel. (1294.09.18 – 1300.05.29)
Jean Cholet (12 April 1281 – 2 August 1293)
Simon de Brion (17 December 1261 – 22 February 1281)
Simon de Sully (1231 – 1232)
Paio Galvão, O.S.B. (1210 – 1212)
Pietro Diana (1188 – 1208)
Cinzio Papareschi (1178 – 1182)
Pietro (1178 – 1178)
Tiberio Savelli (1176 – 1178)
Manfredo, O.S.B. Cas. (1173 – 1176)
Pietro (1159.02 – ?)
Ottaviano di Monticelli (later Antipope Victor IV) (2 March 1151 – 7 September 1159)
 Goselinus (Joselmo) (1128.12 – 1132?)
Joannes (c.1106 – 1128)
Desiderius da Benevento, O.S.B. Cas. (1059 – 1086)

References

Sources

 Jacobus Laderchius, S. Cæciliæ virg. et mart. acta et Transtyberina basilica 2 vols. (Roma: Pagliarini 1723).
 Vincenzo Forcella, Inscrizioni delle chiese di Roma (Roma 1873), pp. 17–46. (The inscriptions found in the church)
 Bertha Ellen Lovewell, The Life of St. Cecilia (Boston-New York-London: Lamson, Wolffe and Company, 1898). 
 Torquato Picarelli, Basilica e casa romana di Santa Cecilia in Trastevere (Roma : Romana, 1904).
 Torquato Piccarelli, Monografia storica anecdotica della chiesa, cripta, e casa di S. Cecilia in Trastevere (Roma 1922). 
 Hüls, Rudolf (1977).  Kardinal, Klerus und Kirchen Roms: 1049–1130, Tübingen: Max Niemeyer 1977. 
 Neda Parmegiani and Alberto Pronti, Il complesso di S. Cecilia in Trastevere (Roma : Sydaco Editrice, 1997).
 Anna Maria Panzera, The Basilica of Santa Cecilia in Trastevere (Roma: Nuove Edizioni Romane, 2001).
 Valentina Oliva, La basilica di Santa Cecilia (Genua : Marconi arti grafiche, 2004) (Edizioni d'arte Marconi, N. 73).

External links

Official website with visiting hours
Chris Nyborg, "Santa Cecilia in Trastevere"
 Armellini, Mariano, "S. Cecilia in Trastevere", Le chiese di Roma dal secolo IV al XIX, Tipografia Vaticana, 1891. Through Bill Thayer's site, Lacus Curtius.
 Kunsthistorie.com, photogallery

Cecilia in Trastevere
Roman Catholic churches completed in 1725
Religious buildings and structures completed in 822
Titular churches
5th-century churches
Burial places of popes
Baroque architecture in Rome
Churches of Rome (rione Trastevere)
18th-century Roman Catholic church buildings in Italy